Henderson Middle School may refer to:

Henderson Middle School, DeKalb County School District, DeKalb County, Georgia, US
Henderson Middle School, El Paso Independent School District, El Paso, Texas, US
Henderson Middle School, Vance County Public Schools, Henderson, North Carolina, US
Henderson Middle School, Henderson Independent School District, Henderson, Texas, US
Henderson Middle School, Hardin-Jefferson Independent School District, Hardin County, Texas, US
Henderson Middle School, Butts County Schools, Jackson, Georgia, US

See also
Mary Ellen Henderson Middle School, Falls Church City Public Schools, Idylwood, Virginia, US
Thomas H. Henderson Middle School, Richmond Public Schools, Richmond, Virginia, US
Henderson Health Sciences Magnet Middle School, Little Rock School District, Little Rock, Arkansas, US